Terminal City was the name of a free independent weekly magazine created by Darren Atwater and Dave Holden from the ashes of AF Magazine. The magazine was started in 1992. as an "every-other weekly", with initial circulation in Vancouver, Bellingham, and occasionally Whistler and Seattle. Later, Terminal City was distributed in the Vancouver and Bellingham areas during the 1990s. There was often trouble getting the paper on the streets on time, sometimes it was a day or two late. This partly resulted in spotty advertising revenue. The first issue featured an interview by Jonathan Hagey of Bruce McCulloch from Kids in the Hall on the cover. It had a significant cultural impact on the city during its long off-again on-again publication. Pete Fry designed the logo, and did graphics for the publication for a large portion of its existence. An article by Brian Salmi, predicting forthcoming riot violence was blamed for having a role in the 1994 Stanley Cup Riot. The paper, and Salmi were never charged. It was one of the first papers to carry Dan Savage's "Savage Love" column other than his home publication, The Stranger, based out of Seattle. There was immediate controversy, as each letter had to address Savage as "Hey Faggot". In 1996, Brian Salmi was at it again, as he and Terminal City encouraged people off the street to run for Mayor of Vancouver, the goal was 100 candidates- the campaign resulted in 58 total names on the ballot. In future elections the fee requirement for city mayoral election was raised and applications had to be submitted in person rather than by fax. In 1994, TC received national attention when the paper published a centrefold "pin the leg on the separatist" campaign, and ran a competition at the Niagara Pub. This campaign was mocking Quebec Separatist leader, Lucien Bouchard after he lost his leg to a flesh-eating bacteria. It ceased operation for several years until being revived in 2001. Approximately in 2004 the paper's staff and management came to unresolvable differences resulting in a split where some of the TC staff founded Only Magazine. This new incarnation of Terminal City was published by John Kay and edited by Bess Lovejoy, Chris Eng, Adam Harrison, Aaron Peck, and Heather Watson. In October 2005, Terminal City ceased publication. Terminal City contained articles and event listings, often spotlighting local music subculture or local fashion, critical reviews, local or international politics, local art. It was a bombastic and opinionated paper and featured local rabble-rouser Brian "Godzilla" Salmi often. In the later years a prominent columnist was Amil Niazi. Antics of the Rhinoceros Party of Canada were of the style of this paper. Comedian and comic book writer Ian Boothby was a cartoonist for the magazine with his comic strip, "I". The final edition was edited by Ian King. Atwater resides in London, UK and occasionally writes for The Huffington Post.

Other facts
It once featured local Suicide Girls models, Bruce McCulloch, Ren and Stimpy, The Real McKenzies, and Paul Watson on its cover.
The Vancouver Public Library did not collect any copies for posterity, as it does not archive weekly papers other than the Georgia Straight.
During the final version of the paper the local artwork of Ehren Salazar was featured on the cover.

References

External links
Only magazine article about the death of Terminal City

Defunct magazines published in Canada
Free magazines
Local interest magazines published in Canada
Magazines established in 1992
Magazines disestablished in 2005
Magazines published in Vancouver
Weekly magazines published in Canada